The International Energy Conservation Code (IECC) is a building code created by the International Code Council in 2000. It is a model code adopted by many states and municipal governments in the United States for the establishment of minimum design and construction requirements for energy efficiency. The code is updated every 3 years, to provide a ongoing standard of best practices for energy efficiency.

See also
EnergySmart Home Scale

References

External links
 Building Energy Codes Program by the US Department of Energy
 International Code Council

Building codes
Building engineering
Energy conservation
International standards